Archibald Hamilton, 9th Duke of Hamilton and 6th Duke of Brandon (15 July 1740 – 16 February 1819) was a Scottish peer and politician.

Background and education
Hamilton was the second son of the 5th Duke of Hamilton, by his third wife, Anne Spencer, and was educated at Eton.

Political career
In 1768, Hamilton became member of parliament for Lancashire and held the seat until 1772 when he was appointed a Steward of the Chiltern Hundreds. In 1799, he inherited his half-nephew's titles and was appointed his successor as Lord Lieutenant of Lanarkshire.

Horse racing
Hamilton was a prominent figure in the world of Thoroughbred horse racing. Between 1786 and 1814 his horses won seven runnings of the St Leger Stakes at Doncaster.

Family
On 25 May 1765, he married Lady Harriet Stewart (a daughter of the 6th Earl of Galloway) and they had five children:
Lady Anne (1766–1846), lady-in-waiting to Queen Caroline, died unmarried (see also Olivia Serres)
Alexander Hamilton, 10th Duke of Hamilton (1767–1852)
Lord Archibald Hamilton (1769–1827)
Lady Charlotte (1772–1827), married the 11th Duke of Somerset
Lady Susan (1774–1846), married the 5th Earl of Dunmore

The duke died in 1819 and was succeeded by his eldest son.

References

External links

|-

1740 births
1819 deaths
British MPs 1768–1774
109
106
06
Archibald Hamilton, 9th Duke of Hamilton
Lord-Lieutenants of Lanarkshire
Members of the Parliament of Great Britain for Lancashire
People educated at Eton College